Filip Brekalo (born 9 June 2002) is a professional footballer who plays as a left-back for Bosnian Premier League side Zrinjski Mostar. Born in Bosnia and Herzegovina, he represented Croatia at youth international level.

International career 
In 2019, Brekalo was capped for Croatia at the under-17 and under-18 levels.

References

External links

2002 births
Living people
Sportspeople from Mostar
Bosnia and Herzegovina footballers
Croatian footballers
Association football fullbacks
NK Široki Brijeg players
HŠK Zrinjski Mostar players
Premier League of Bosnia and Herzegovina players
Croatia youth international footballers
Croats of Bosnia and Herzegovina